Scott Andrew Schwedes (born June 30, 1965) is a former American football wide receiver who played four seasons in the National Football League (NFL) with the Miami Dolphins and San Diego Chargers. He was drafted by the Dolphins in the second round of the 1987 NFL Draft with the 56th overall pick. He played college football at Syracuse University and attended Jamesville-DeWitt High School in DeWitt, New York. His father Gerhard Schwedes also played football at Syracuse and later the American Football League.

References

External links
Just Sports Stats

Living people
1965 births
American people of German descent
Players of American football from Syracuse, New York
American football wide receivers
American football return specialists
Syracuse Orange football players
Miami Dolphins players
San Diego Chargers players
People from DeWitt, New York